Mademoiselle Mars (pseudonym of Anne Françoise Hyppolyte Boutet Salvetat; 9 February 1779 – 20 March 1847), French actress, was born in Paris, the natural daughter of the actor-author named Monvel (Jacques Marie Boutet) (1745–1812) and Jeanne-Marie Salvetat (1748–1838), an actress known as Madame Mars, whose southern accent had made her Paris debut a failure.

Life
Mlle Mars began her stage career in children's parts, and by 1799, after the rehabilitation of the Comédie-Française, she and her elder half-sister (Marie-Louise-Geneviève Salvetat, called Louise and known professionally as Mlle Mars aînée) joined that company, of which she remained an active member for 33 years. Her beauty and talents soon placed her at the top of her profession.

She was incomparable in ingenue parts, and equally charming as the coquette. Molière, Marivaux, Michel-Jean Sedaine, and Pierre Beaumarchais had no more accomplished interpreter, and in her career of half a century, besides many comedy roles of the older repertoire, she created fully a hundred parts in plays which owed success largely to her. She also helped educate foreign actors, among them the Swedish actors Charlotta Eriksson and Emilie Högquist. For her farewell performance she selected Elmire in Tartuffe, and Silvia in Jeu de l'amour et du hasard, two of her most popular roles; and for her benefit, a few days after, Climène in Le Misanthrope and Araminthe in Les Femmes savantes.

By her liaison with a Swiss-born French soldier, Nicolas Bronner (1773–1816), she had three children: a son, who died at birth; Louis-Alphonse (born 14 March 1799), and a daughter, Hippolyte (1800-31 March 1820).

Mademoiselle Mars retired following 1841 and died in Paris on 20 March 1847. She and her children are buried in Pere Lachaise cemetery; sharing the tomb is the body of her niece, an actress known as Georgina Mars (died 1828).

References

External links
 
 
 

1779 births
1847 deaths
19th-century French actresses
French stage actresses
Sociétaires of the Comédie-Française
Burials at Père Lachaise Cemetery